Zeyn ol Din (also Romanized as Zeyn ol Dīn, Zeyn Ed Dīn, and Zeyn od Dīn; also known as Amīr Zeyn od Dīn and Shahrak-e Zeyn od Dīn) is a village in Aspas Rural District, Sedeh District, Eqlid County, Fars Province, Iran. At the 2006 census, its population was 91, in 16 families.

References 

Populated places in Eqlid County